Vrtanes Mesrop Papazian (1866–1920), was an Armenian writer, public-political and cultural activist, literary critic, editor, literature historian, teacher and translator.

Biography

Vrtanes Papazian was born in the city of Van, Ottoman Empire, in 1866. His father, archimandrite Mesrop Papazyan, was a well-known religious and public figure, pedagogue, writer, theater expert, and playwright. At the age of four he moved with his parents to Agulis where he received his primary education. He continued his study at the Aramian School in Tavriz and Gevorgian Theological Seminary in Etchmiadzin. Later he studied at the Geneva University, the faculty of literature and social sciences.

Hard conditions made him start working at the age of 15 and wander from city to city, country to country. He worked as a laborer, photographer and telegrapher. For a long period he was teaching at schools in several cities (Van, Karin, Tbilisi, Tehran, Shoushi, Bucharest etc.). He worked as the editor of newspapers Free Armenia, Struggle of the Armenian revolutionist labourer association (Tbilisi), of the weekly Path (Tehran) and of the weekly Karabakh (Shoushi). He cooperated with a number of Armenian, Russian and European press organs.

The events of the 1915 genocide did not pass by his family. His brother, Nerses Papazyan (archimandrite Mashtots), abbot of Armenian Church in the northern American cities of Worcester and Boston, was arrested on 24 April 1915 in Constantinople and killed by the Turkish executioners.

Literary works

The literary legacy of Vrtanes Papazian is regarded as the twin of his life – a valiant fighting of pen against national and social oppression, struggle for national survival and bright future. Looking into historical and current standards of various nations the writer referred to the Armenian life and culture in the light of those standards assessing national realities upon a wide range of criteria. His prolific literary creation is an outcome of a wide sphere of mental activity – prose, dramaturgy, poetry, literary criticism, history of literature, producer work, music, pedagogy, linguistics, translation, logics, psychology etc.

Early writings of Papazian are about the life of Western Armenians. During the 1890s these stories appeared in the press. Later they were published in two books: Scenes from the Life of Turkish Armenians (1889) and Stories from the Life of Turkish Armenians (1904). Speaking about the horrors by Turks and Kurds, he did not ignore the national oppressors showing that their conduct was equally horrible.

Papazian condemned servility and fawn, setting forward tragic scenes from Western Armenian struggle against the organizers of genocide and creating characters of valiant individuals (“Kheran”, “Lightning”, “Light Pleasures”, “The Dying are Greeting You”). He holds a relentless debate against any vicious opinion. The novel Emma strongly criticizes some national parties as being separated from the nation. While based in European countries far from the homeland these parties proclaim themselves as leaders of struggle against tyranny.

References

Ethnic Armenian translators
Armenian-language writers
19th-century writers from the Ottoman Empire
1920 deaths
1866 births
People from Van, Turkey
Armenians from the Ottoman Empire
University of Geneva alumni
19th-century male writers
19th-century translators